Richard Waddington (22 May 1838 – 26 June 1913)

was a French parliamentarian and historian, brother of William Henry (Prime Minister of France) and cousin of Professor Charles Waddington.

Family business
The Waddingtons originally hailed from Lincolnshire but became merchant bankers in London as well establishing cotton mills in Lancashire.

His father, Thomas Waddington, took control of the family business ventures in France after his brother William's death in 1821. Senator Waddington's mother was Anne, granddaughter of William Chisholm MD, son of The Chisholm (qv. Roderick Chisholm, 21st Chief of Chisholm).
 
Richard Waddington was a director of "Établissements Waddington fils et Cie" at Saint-Rémy-sur-Avre in Eure-et-Loir.

Politics and writing 
Waddington was elected a Deputy to the French Parliament in 1876, where his industrial experience was valued. He sat on the Centre-Left benches until 1891 when he was elected as Senator for Seine-Inférieure. He was returned to the Senate in 1900 and in 1909, where he served until his death in 1913.

He wrote Louis XV et le renversement des alliances (1896), and La guerre de sept ans: histoire diplomatique et militaire (five volumes, Paris : Firmin-Didot et cie, published 1899–1914).

M. le sénateur Waddington died in 1913, although some of his writings were published later.

Marriage
In 1860 he married Louise Marie Anne Collison; they had a son, Brigadier-General Walter Waddington (born 1864), a senior French Army officer, who died in Germany in 1920.

Honours 
  - Chevalier, Légion d'honneur

See also
 Professor Charles Waddington, cousin of William Henry Waddington
 William Henry Waddington, Prime Minister of France and brother of Richard Waddington
 Alfred Waddington, uncle of Richard Waddington

References

External links
 www.senat.fr
 www.legiondhonneur.fr

1838 births
1913 deaths
French people of English descent
19th-century French historians
French Army officers
Chevaliers of the Légion d'honneur
Fellows of the Society of Antiquaries of London
French male non-fiction writers
Senators of Seine-Maritime